William Stanley "Bear" Rinehart III (born September 6, 1980; also known by the stage name Wilder Woods) is an American singer, songwriter, and guitarist who is a founding member and lead singer of the rock band, Needtobreathe. In 2019, he announced the launch of a solo career under the name Wilder Woods. His debut solo album was released on Atlantic Records in August 2019.

Career

In April 2019, Rinehart began releasing music under the name Wilder Woods, starting with the songs "Someday Soon" and "Sure Ain't". The stage name comes from the names of Rinehart's two oldest sons, Wilder and Woods. His debut solo studio album was released in August 2019 by Atlantic Records. The album debuted at No. 20 on Billboard Emerging Artists and No. 2 on Top Heatseekers. The album single "Supply & Demand" peaked at No. 27 on Adult Alternative Songs chart. He has also been a featured artist on a variety of songs for acts like American Authors and others.

As a member of Needtobreathe, Rinehart was nominated for a Grammy Award in 2015.

Personal life

Rinehart is married to Mary Reames, with whom he has three sons, Wilder Rinehart, Woods Rinehart, and Waters Rinehart. Rinehart was also an accomplished college football wide receiver setting school records at Furman University between 1999 and 2002.

Discography

Albums

As Wilder Woods

As a member of Needtobreathe 

 Daylight (2006)
The Heat (2007)
The Outsiders (2009)
The Reckoning (2011)
Rivers in the Wasteland (2014)
Hard Love (2016)
Out of Body (2020)
Into the Mystery (2021)

Singles

As Wilder Woods

Music videos

References

External links
Wilder Woods official website
Needtobreathe official website

Living people
1980 births
American singer-songwriters
American rock guitarists
Furman University alumni
Atlantic Records artists